Taman Selatan or Southern Park is a national cemetery in Precinct 20, Putrajaya, Malaysia.

Features
It is located at Precinct 20 and it occupies 192.38 hectares. The site has 570 grave plots, of these:
 331 are reserved for Muslims,
 94 for Buddhists,
 55 for Christians,
 61 for Hindus and
 the final 29 plots for other religions.
 Pusara Negarawan, a national cemetery for Malaysian national leaders located at the Muslim cemetery.

Notable burials 
 Azizan Zainul Abidin – corporate figure and President of Putrajaya Corporation and Petronas. (died 2004)
 Endon Mahmood – wife of former Prime Minister of Malaysia Abdullah Ahmad Badawi. (died 2005)
 Ahmad Hakimi Hanapi – Malaysia Airlines MH17 co-pilot who perished in the Malaysia Airlines Flight 17 crash on 17 July 2014. (died 2014) Nor Shazana Mohamed Salleh – Malaysia Airlines stewardess who perished in the Malaysia Airlines Flight 17 crash on 17 July 2014. (died 2014) Ali Hamsa – 13th Chief Secretary to the Government of Malaysia. (died 2022)''

External links
 Taman Selatan website
 

Cemeteries in Malaysia
Buildings and structures in Putrajaya
Tourist attractions in Putrajaya
2003 establishments in Malaysia